UnReal (styled unReal) is the third studio album by American heavy metal band My Ticket Home. It was released on October 6, 2017, through Spinefarm. It is the band's first release with Spinefarm, as well as the band's first album since 2013's Strangers Only.

Track listing

Personnel
Credits are adapted from the album's liner notes.

My Ticket Home
 Nick Giumenti – lead vocals, bass
 Derek Blevins – guitars, vocals
 Matt Gallucci – guitars
 Marshal Giumenti – drums
Additional musicians
 Amy Archambault – spoken word vocals on "Time Kills Everything"

Production
 Fred Archambault – production, recording, mixing
 Gerardo "Jerry" Ordonez – recording, programming
 Nick Giumenti – mixing
 Jarred Bigelow – editing 
 Gendry Studer – mastering
 Charles Godfrey – drum tech

References

2017 albums
Spinefarm Records albums
My Ticket Home albums
Grunge albums
Nu metal albums by American artists
Albums recorded at Sonic Ranch